The Forest Cemetery Entrance is a historic structure located in Oskaloosa, Iowa, United States.  It was designed by Frank E. Wetherell and built in 1915.  While he was known for his buildings, he was also involved with civic improvement projects in Des Moines that included the beautification of the banks along the Des Moines River.  This included a series of walls and walkways, and planning new thoroughfares to ease traffic congestion.  The two pillars are composed of rusticated grey Barre Granite.  They have name of the cemetery, "Forest," carved on them.  Walls extend from the pillars and include openings for sidewalks.  They end at iron fences.  It was listed on the National Register of Historic Places in 1991.

References

National Register of Historic Places in Mahaska County, Iowa
Buildings and structures completed in 1915
Buildings and structures in Mahaska County, Iowa
Cemeteries in Iowa
Cemeteries on the National Register of Historic Places in Iowa
Oskaloosa, Iowa